Jerry Garcia Band is the second album, and first live album, by the Jerry Garcia Band. It was recorded in the spring and summer of 1990 at The Warfield in San Francisco.  It was released by Arista Records as a two-disc CD in August 1991.  It was released as a five-disc LP on December 3, 2021.

Critical reception

On Allmusic, Lindsay Planer said, "The quartet is led by Jerry Garcia and features longtime Garcia associate John Kahn (bass), Melvin Seals (keyboards), David Kemper (drums), Gloria Jones (vocals), and Jackie LaBranch (vocals). The selections accurately image the wide spectrum of pop, R&B, rock and soul covers Garcia and company played circa the late '80s and early '90s.... Garcia's rush upon rush of incendiary fretwork equals the verve in practically any Grateful Dead rendering during the early '90s. However, the primary focus is divided between the superior choice of material and equally adroit execution.... The initiated and initially curious alike will find much to enjoy and discover throughout Jerry Garcia Band."

Track listing
Disc one
"The Way You Do the Things You Do" (William "Smokey" Robinson, Bobby Rogers) – 8:08
"Waiting for a Miracle" (Bruce Cockburn) – 5:54
"Simple Twist of Fate" (Bob Dylan) – 11:54
"Get Out of My Life" (Allen Toussaint) – 8:53
"My Sisters and Brothers" (Charles Johnson) – 4:17
"I Shall Be Released" (Bob Dylan) – 9:26
"Dear Prudence" (John Lennon, Paul McCartney) – 11:41
"Deal" (Jerry Garcia, Robert Hunter) – 8:38
Disc two
"Stop That Train" (Peter Tosh) – 8:51
"Senor (Tales of Yankee Power)" (Bob Dylan) – 7:43
"Evangeline" (David Hidalgo, Louie Perez) – 4:47
"The Night They Drove Old Dixie Down" (Robbie Robertson) – 9:36
"Don't Let Go" (Jesse Stone) – 17:16
"That Lucky Old Sun" (Haven Gillespie, Beasley Smith) – 11:32
"Tangled up in Blue" (Bob Dylan) – 12:16

Personnel
Jerry Garcia Band
Jerry Garcia – guitar, vocals
John Kahn – bass guitar
Melvin Seals – organ, keyboards
David Kemper – drums
Jackie LaBranch – background vocals
Gloria Jones – background vocals
Production
Producer – Jerry Garcia, John Kahn & John Cutler
Live recording – John Cutler
Additional engineers – David Roberts, Andrew Warwick, Peter Miller & Justin Kreutzmann
Digital mastering & editing – Joe Gastwirt
Cover art – John Kahn
Photography – Ken Friedman
Design – Carolyn Quan
Art coordination – Amy Finkle

References

Jerry Garcia Band live albums
1991 live albums
Arista Records live albums